"My Love" is a song by American R&B singer Joe. It was written by Greg Curtis, Johnta Austin, and Bryan-Michael Cox for his sixth studio album Ain't Nothin' Like Me (2007), while production was helmed by Cox and Curtis, featuring co-production from Kendrick "WyldCard" Dean. Released as the album's third and final single, it peaked at number two on the US Billboard Adult R&B Songs chart.

Track listings

Credits and personnel

 Chris Athens – mastering
 Johnta Austin – writer
 Bryan-Michael Cox – producer, writer
 Greg Curtis – producer, writer

 Kendrick "WyldCard" Dean – co-producer
 Joe – executive producer
 Kedar Massenburg – executive producer

Charts

References

2008 singles
2007 songs
Joe (singer) songs
Songs written by Johntá Austin
Songs written by Bryan-Michael Cox
Jive Records singles
Song recordings produced by Bryan-Michael Cox